Cheryl Pounder (born June 21, 1976, in Montreal, Quebec) is a women's ice hockey player.  She played defence for the Canadian Women's Hockey League's Mississauga Chiefs, and competed in the 2002 and 2006 Winter Olympics.

Pounder attended high school at St. Martin Secondary School in Mississauga, Ontario. She was also the captain of the ice hockey team at Wilfrid Laurier University. Although born in Montreal, she lives in Mississauga, Ontario and calls that city her hometown. Pounder was part of the team that won the Under-18 Canadian National women's ice hockey championship. She was also a member of the 1992 Women's World Roller Hockey championship team.

Pounder was a colour commentator for the CBC coverage of the women's hockey tournament at the 2014 and 2018 Winter Olympics.

CWHL
With the Beatrice Aeros, Pounder competed in three Women's Canadian National hockey championships from 1999 to 2001. The Aeros won bronze in 1999 and 2001, and won the gold in 2000. Pounder was the Master of Ceremonies at the 2010 CWHL Draft.

Personal life
Pounder is married and welcomed her first child, a girl, on January 25, 2008.

Her niece Rhyen McGill won the NCAA national championship in 2017 with Clarkson University, and played in Team Canada's junior system.

Career statistics
Career statistics are from Eliteprospects.com.

Regular season and playoffs

International

Career highlights
Two Olympic gold medals (2002, 2006)
Five World Championship gold medals (1994, 1999, 2000, 2001, 2004) and one silver (2005)
Seven Nations Cup gold medals (1996, 1998, 1999, 2001, 2002, 2004, 2005) and one silver (2003)
All-Star selection, 2005 IIHF women's world hockey championships

Awards and honours
CWHL First All-Star Team, 2008–09
Top Defender, Pool A, 2007 Esso Canadian Women's Nationals
Top Defender at the 2002 Esso Canadian National Championship
NWHL West First All-Star Team, 1999-00
COWHL Second All-Star Team, 1996–97

CIS honours
1995-96 OUA Second Team All-Star
1996-97 OUA Second Team All-Star
1997-98 OUA First Team All-Star
1998 Wilfrid Laurier athletics President's Award
2005 Inductee, Laurier Golden Hawk Hall of Fame

References

1976 births
Living people
Anglophone Quebec people
Canadian women's ice hockey defencemen
Sportspeople from Mississauga
Ice hockey people from Montreal
Ice hockey players at the 2002 Winter Olympics
Ice hockey players at the 2006 Winter Olympics
Medalists at the 2002 Winter Olympics
Medalists at the 2006 Winter Olympics
Olympic gold medalists for Canada
Olympic ice hockey players of Canada
Olympic medalists in ice hockey
Wilfrid Laurier Golden Hawks ice hockey players
Ice hockey people from Ontario
Mississauga Chiefs players